Es muss nicht immer Kaviar sein ("It Can’t Always Be Caviar") is a TV adaption of a novel of the same name by Austrian author Johannes Mario Simmel. Directed by Thomas Engel Siegfried Rauch walks in the footsteps of O. W. Fischer who played the protagonist "Thomas Lieven" already in 1961, just one year after the bestseller  had been released. The series is unique for providing a little cooking show at the end of each episode. The book also includes recipes because "Thomas Lieven" is an accomplished amateur cook.

Plot
Thomas Lieven works as employee of an International bank in the City of London. Occasionally he is the bank's courier for he is fluent in three languages: English of course, but also German and French. In 1939 he is again sent to Germany but this time it is different because the Gestapo arrests him. Thomas Lieven, a pacifist through and through, has no interest whatsoever to even toy with the thought to get entangled in spy business but the German secret service doesn't take no for an answer. So he has to pretend compliance for the time being, just to be able to get home to England. But when he returns to London he gets arrested again, this time by English secret service. It is explained to him that it was his duty to become a  double agent. Thomas Lieven is no Eddie Chapman and the mere idea of having to go to Nazi Germany another time seems to be unbearable. So he escapes to France, but is picked up by French secret service. Like German "Major Loos" (Herbert Fleischmann) and British "Mr. Lovejoy" (Rainer Penkert) also French "Captain Simeon" (Erik Schumann) attempts to persuade Lieven that he ought to serve him. In the course of a mission in Marseille he meets the small-time criminal "Bastian Fabre" (Heinz Reincke) who introduces him to his boss, an attractive lady called Chantal (Marisa Mell). She falls for his gentleman-like manners and his exquisite meals. That he she has in common with other ladies he will also acquaint during the adventures about to come: "Estrella" (Nadja Tiller), "Yvonne" (Heidrun Kussin), "Jeanne" (Louise Martini) and eventually "Helen" (Christiane Krüger) who wants to recruit him for the American secret service.

The series covers only the first half of the novel. The second half was never filmed.

Episode overview

References

External links

 

1977 German television series debuts
1977 German television series endings
German-language television shows
Films directed by Thomas Engel
Espionage television series
Cooking television series
Television shows based on German novels
Television remakes of films
World War II television series
ZDF original programming